Geomitridae is a taxonomic family of small to medium-sized air-breathing land snails, terrestrial pulmonate gastropod mollusks in the superfamily Helicoidea.

Anatomy
The family is characterized by the presence of a free right ommatophoral retractor (passing outside the peni-oviducal angle) and a double stimulatory apparatus.  A free right ommatophoral retractor has been linked to adaptation to xeric habitats

Taxonomy 
The family Geomitridae is subdivided in the following subfamilies (according to Razkin et al., 2015) 
Subfamily Geomitrinae
 tribe Cochlicellini Schileyko, 1972
 tribe Geomitrini C. Boettger, 1909 - synonym: Ochthephilinae Zilch, 1960 (n.a.)
 tribe Ponentinini Razkin et al., 2015
Subfamily Helicellinae
 tribe Cernuellini Schileyko, 1991
 tribe Helicellini Ihering, 1909 - synonym: Jacostidae Pilsbry, 1948 (inv.)
 tribe Helicopsini H. Nordsieck, 1987
 tribe Plentuisini Razkin et al., 2015
 tribe Trochoideini H. Nordsieck, 1987

Genera 
Genera with the family Geomitridae include:

Not belonging to a subfamily:
 Keraea Gude, 1911
 Peridotitea Torres Alba, Holyoak, D. T., Holyoak, G. A., Vázquez Toro & Ripoll, 2018

Subfamily Geomitrinae

 tribe Cochlicellini
 Cochlicella Férussac, 1821
 Monilearia Mousson, 1872
 Obelus W. Hartmann, 1842
 Ripkeniella Hutterer & E. Gittenberger, 1998
 tribe Geomitrini
 Actinella R. T. Lowe, 1852
 Callina R. T. Lowe, 1855
 Caseolus R. T. Lowe, 1852
 Discula R. T. Lowe, 1852
 Disculella Pilsbry, 1895
 Domunculifex Brozzo, De Mattia, Harl & Neiber, 2020
 Geomitra Swainson, 1840
 Helicomela R. T. Lowe, 1855
 Heterostoma W. Hartmann, 1843: synonym of Steenbergia Mandahl-Barth, 1950 (invalid: junior homonym of Heterostoma de Filippi, 1837 [Platyhelminthes])
 Hystricella R. T. Lowe, 1855
 Lemniscia R. T. Lowe, 1855
 Moreletina de Frias Martins, 2002
 Plebecula R. T. Lowe, 1852
 Pseudocampylaea L. Pfeiffer, 1877
 Serratorotula Groh & Hemmen, 1986
 Spirorbula R. T. Lowe, 1852
 Steenbergia Mandahl-Barth, 1950
 Testudodiscula Brozzo, De Mattia, Harl & Neiber, 2020
 Wollastonaria De Mattia, Neiber & Groh, 2018
 tribe Ponentinini
 Ponentina P. Hesse, 1921

subfamily Helicellinae

 tribe Cernuellini
 Alteniella Clerx & Gittenberger, 1977
 Cernuella Schlüter, 1838
 Microxeromagna Ortiz de Zárate López, 1950
 Xeroplana Monterosato, 1892
 Xerosecta Monterosato, 1892
 tribe Helicellini 
Backeljaia Chueca et al., 2018
Candidula Kobelt, 1871
 Helicella Férussac, 1821
 Orexana Chueca et al., 2018
 Xerogyra Monterosato, 1892
 Xeroleuca Kobelt, 1877
 Xeroplexa Monterosato, 1892
 Xerotricha Monterosato, 1892
 Zarateana Chueca et al., 2018
 tribe Helicopsini H. Nordsieck, 1987
 Helicopsis Fitzinger, 1833
 Pseudoxerophila Westerlund, 1879
 Xerolenta Monterosato, 1892
 Xeromunda Monterosato, 1892
 Xeropicta Monterosato, 1892
 tribe Plentuisini
 Plentuisa  Puente & Prieto, 1992
 tribe Trochoideini
 Trochoidea T. Brown, 1827
 Xerocrassa Monterosato, 1892

References 

 Bouchet P., Rocroi J.P., Hausdorf B., Kaim A., Kano Y., Nützel A., Parkhaev P., Schrödl M. & Strong E.E. (2017). Revised classification, nomenclator and typification of gastropod and monoplacophoran families. Malacologia. 61(1-2): 1-526

External links 
 https://liferecovernatura.madeira.gov.pt
 Razkin, O., Gómez-Moliner, B. J., Prieto, C. E., Martínez-Ortí, A., Arrébola, J. R., Muñoz, B., Chueca, L. J. & Madeira, M. J. (2015). Molecular phylogeny of the western Palaearctic Helicoidea (Gastropoda, Stylommatophora). Molecular Phylogenetics and Evolution. 83: 99-117

 
Helicoidea